Finian Hanley (born 4 January 1985) is a former Gaelic football player from Galway. He played his club football with Salthill-Knocknacarra and inter-county football for Galway from 2005 to 2017. He played in the full-back position. In 2008 he was nominated for an All Stars Award.

Inter-county
In 2005, Hanley was a member of Galway's Under-21 All-Ireland winning team, winning the final against Down with inspired performances from Michael Meehan, Barry Cullinane and club team-mate Seán Armstrong.

After being a key figure in Galway's successful Minor and Under-21 teams of recent years, Hanley made his Senior debut against Mayo in the 2005 Connacht SFC Final. He has since made the full-back position his own, winning three Connacht titles, in 2005,2008 & 2016.

Hanley was a part of Salthill-Knocknacarra's triumphant All-Ireland Club Championship-winning side in 2006. They defeated St. Galls of Antrim in the final by 0–07 to 0-06. Hanley was named Man Of The Match for his performance, repelling several of the Antrim side's attacks.

International rules
In 2008, he represented Ireland against Australia in Australia in the International Rules Series in which they won.

In 2010, he was vice-captain of the Irish team in the International Rules Series in Ireland in which they lost out narrowly.

In 2011, he was chosen to represent his country once more 

In 2013, he was chosen to represent his country again. He played in the first test in Cavan but  a hamstring tear ruled him out of the second test at Croke Park a week later.

In 2014, he was again chosen to represent Ireland in the one test series in Perth. Ireland narrowly lost out to Australia on this occasion.

Honours

Club
Galway Senior Football Championship (2): 2005, 2012
Connacht Senior Club Football Championship (1): 2005
All-Ireland Senior Club Football Championship (1): 2006

County
Connacht Under-21 Football Championship (1): 2005
All-Ireland Under-21 Football Championship (1): 2005
Connacht Senior Football Championship (3): 2005, 2008, 2016
FBD Insurance League (4): 2006, 2008, 2009, 2017

Individual
Man of The Match All-Ireland Club Final (1): 2006
International Rules (5): 2008, 2010, 2011, 2013, 2014

References

1985 births
Living people
People from Galway (city)
Galway inter-county Gaelic footballers
Irish international rules football players
Salthill-Knocknacarra Gaelic footballers